Dordabis is a settlement in the Khomas Region of central Namibia, 80 km east of the capital Windhoek. It belongs to the Windhoek Rural electoral constituency and has approximately 1,500 inhabitants. Dordabis has a post office, health clinic, police station and primary school. Dordabis is riddled with alcoholism, unemployment, and violence, the main economical activity is farming.

References

Populated places in the Khomas Region